Idle generally refers to idleness, a lack of motion or energy.

Idle or idling, may also refer to:

Technology 
 Idle (engine), engine running without load
 Idle speed
 Idle (CPU), CPU non-utilisation or low-priority mode
 Synchronous Idle (SYN), the idle command to synchronize terminals
 System Idle Process
 Idle (programming language), a dialect of Lua
 IDLE, an integrated development environment for the Python programming language
 IMAP IDLE, an IMAP feature where an email server actively notifies a client application when new mail has arrived

Places
 Idle (GNR) railway station, in Idle, West Yorkshire
 Idle (L&BR) railway station, in Idle, West Yorkshire
 Idle, West Yorkshire, UK; a suburb of Bradford, England
 Idle railway station
 Idle and Thackley, a ward in Bradford Metropolitan District in the county of West Yorkshire, England, UK
 Idle railway station (Leeds and Bradford Railway)
 River Idle, a river flowing through Nottinghamshire, England

People
 Mrs. Idle (born 1940), a stagename for Australian actress Lyn Ashley
 Christopher Idle (politician) (1771–1819), British politician
 Christopher Idle (hymnwriter) (born 1938), British hymnodist
 Eric Idle (born 1943), a comedian, sketch writer, and actor, member of Monty Python
 Graham Idle (born 1950), British rugby footballer

Entertainment

Music
 Idle, a 2000 demo album by the band Daylight Dies

Video games
 Idle game, another name for an incremental game

Other uses
 Indolent lesions of epithelial origin (IDLE), a classification of cancers

See also

 
 
 Adle
 Christopher Idle (disambiguation)
 Ideal (disambiguation)
 Idel (disambiguation)
 Idle Hour (disambiguation)
 Idler (disambiguation)
 Idles (disambiguation)
 Idol (disambiguation)
 Idyl (disambiguation)